Cathcart Tower is a Martello tower located on Cedar Island in the St. Lawrence River, off the eastern shore of Fort Henry in Kingston, Ontario, Canada.  It is one of four such towers built in the 1840s to protect Kingston's harbour and the entrance to the Rideau Canal. The other towers are: Fort Frederick, Shoal Tower, and Murney Tower.  Alexander Mackenzie was a foreman on the construction of the Carthcart Tower and later went on to become Canada's second prime minister 1873–1878.  It was his work crew whose boat capsized while returning from Cedar Island, drowning 17 men.  Hamilton Cove was subsequently renamed Deadman's Bay.

Built in 1848, this limestone tower is 11 m high and 16.5 m in diameter. It is surrounded by a shallow ditch and by a glacis extending to the shorelines on three sides. The guns of Cathcart Tower covered the eastern approaches of Kingston Harbour.

The towers' construction was prompted by a dispute between Great Britain and the United States over the boundary between British Columbia and Oregon that threatened to lead to war (see Oregon crisis). When war was averted, Cathcart Tower was used for a time as a barracks for soldiers garrisoned at nearby Fort Henry. Eventually it was abandoned.

The tower is now part of the Rideau Canal and Kingston Fortifications National Historic Site, the Rideau Canal and Kingston Fortifications UNESCO World Heritage Site, and is within the boundaries of Thousand Islands National Park (formerly St. Lawrence Islands National Park).

The tower is reached by small water craft with a dock located on the north side of Cedar Island.

References

External links
 
Kingston Fortifications national historic site of canada Management Plan (Ottawa: Parks Canada, 2006)

Towers completed in 1848
Towers in Ontario
Buildings and structures in Kingston, Ontario
National Historic Sites in Ontario
Tourist attractions in Kingston, Ontario
Martello towers
Limestone buildings